Yaroslav Petrovych Mendus (born 1 January 1960; in Variazh, Lviv Oblast), is a Ukrainian politician. He currently works as Political Advisor to the Vice-President of the European Parliament.

Education

Yaroslav Mendus graduated from Lviv University in 1981, receiving a Diploma with Honours in History.  He finished at the Kyiv Institute of Political Science and Social Administration in 1988 and defended his PhD thesis in History in 1999.

Career
Yaroslav Mendus worked in the Administration of the first President of Ukraine, Leonid Kravchuk. He then worked as Advisor to Oleksandr Moroz (Chairman of the Verkhovna Rada); he was an MP in the 5th Assembly of the Verkhovna Rada; and later worked as Political Advisor to Member of the European Parliament, Marek Siwiec; then as Political Advisor to the Vice-Chair of the Committee on Foreign Affairs in the European Parliament, Ioan Mircea Pascu.

Yaroslav Mendus now works as Political Advisor to the Vice-President of the European Parliament.

Yaroslav Mendus was General Producer of the movie The Orange Sky – a love story, set against the backdrop of the 2004–5 Orange Revolution. In 2004 he founded web-based media "Censor.net". He is author of a collection of essays, A to Z of Ukrainian Politics; and has published many articles on contemporary Ukrainian political life.

References

1960 births
Living people
People from Lviv Oblast
University of Lviv alumni
Fifth convocation members of the Verkhovna Rada
Socialist Party of Ukraine politicians